Vantage Career Center is a public vocational school located in Van Wert, Ohio.  It serves school districts located in the counties of Allen, Mercer, Paulding, Putnam, and Van Wert. Classes are open to juniors and seniors in local high schools.

Associate schools 
Enrollment is open to students from any of Vantage's thirteen partner schools.

Antwerp High School
Continental High School
Crestview High School
Delphos Jefferson High School
Delphos St. John's High School
Fort Jennings High School
Kalida High School
Lincolnview Junior/Senior High School
Ottoville High School
Parkway High School 
Paulding High School
Van Wert High School
Wayne Trace High School

References

Vocational schools in Ohio
High schools in Van Wert County, Ohio
Education in Ohio
Public high schools in Ohio